Cynthia Lysanne Beekhuis is a Dutch football midfielder currently playing for SC Heerenveen in the Eredivisie. She has played for the Dutch national team.

References

1990 births
Living people
Dutch women's footballers
Netherlands women's international footballers
Sportspeople from Apeldoorn
SC Heerenveen (women) players
Eredivisie (women) players
Women's association football midfielders
Footballers from Gelderland